The Spain women's national lacrosse team attempts to represent Spain at women's field lacrosse events. It is governed by the Spanish Lacrosse Association.

Squad
The following players will be called for the 2017 Women's Lacrosse World Cup in England.

Competitive record

Games summary

Official matches

2015 Women's Lacrosse European Championship

2017 Women's Lacrosse World Cup

2019 Women's European Lacrosse Championship

Top goalscorers

Source

See also
Spain men's national lacrosse team
Lacrosse in Spain

References

External links
Spain women's national lacrosse team blog 
Spanish Lacrosse Association
Spain at European Lacrosse Federation website
Spain at Federation of International Lacrosse

Spain
Lacrosse
Lacrosse in Spain
Women's lacrosse in Spain
Women's lacrosse teams